Mary Jane Auch is an author and illustrator of children's books, including One Plus One Equals Blue, Ashes of Roses, The Road to Home, Journey to Nowhere and the I was a Third Grade ... series of books for younger readers. The Princess and the Pizza, a collaboration with Herm Auch, was an International Reading Association Children's Choice in 2003 and won the 2003 Storytelling World Award, as well as being nominated for the Young Hoosier Picture Book Award and the Show Me Readers Award.

After graduating from Skidmore College, she working designing patterns for textiles and in occupational therapy with children. She married the graphic artist Herm Auch in 1967 and started her writing career after raising her family.

References

External links
 

American children's book illustrators
American children's writers
Living people
People from Ontario, New York
Skidmore College alumni
Year of birth missing (living people)